The Belleville Stags were a  minor league baseball team based in Belleville, Illinois. In 1947 and  1948, the Stags played as members of the Class D level Illinois State League and remained a franchise when the league changed names to the Mississippi–Ohio Valley League in 1949, which later evolved to become today's Midwest League. Winners of the 1947 league championship, the Stags were named and supported by their namesake, Stag Beer. The Stags were a minor league affiliate of the St. Louis Browns in 1947 and 1948 and New York Yankees in 1949. Belleville hosted home minor league games at the Belleville Athletic Field, also called "Stag Park" in the era.

History
Minor league baseball in Belleville, Illinois began in 1947, when the Belleville Stags became a charter member of the Class D level Illinois State League. In 1947 league play, the Stags joined the Centralia Cubs, Mattoon Indians, Marion Indians, Mount Vernon Braves, and West Frankfort Cardinals as charter members of the six–team Illinois State League. All the league teams were new franchises.

The use of the "Stags" moniker by Belleville was in reference to the team being sponsored by Stag Beer. Their home ballpark, Belleville Athletic Field, was also referred to as "Stag Park" while the team played there.

In their first season of play, the 1947 Belleville Stags won the Illinois State League championship in the first season of the Class D level league. The Stags, playing as a minor league affiliate of the St. Louis Browns, finished the regular season with a 75–37 record to place first in the standings under manager Walter DeFreitas. The league had no playoffs as Belleville finished 15.0 games ahead of the second place Centralia Cubs in the final standings. Belleville had season home attendance of 18,539, playing home games at Belleville Athletic Field.

Belleville continued play in the 1948 Illinois State League. The Stags finished with a record of 51–67 to place fifth in the standings under managers Gerald Nemitz and Shan Deniston. Belleville finished 33.0 games behind the first place West Frankfort Cardinals in the final standings of the six–team league. Belleville drew 6,085 fans for the season. 1958 Cy Young Award winner and World Series MVP Bob Turley pitched for the 1948 Belleville Stags, pitching to a 9–3 record.

Belleville played their final season in 1949. The Stags continued play as the Illinois State League changed names to become the Class D level Mississippi–Ohio Valley League. The name change occurred after the Paducah Chiefs franchise replaced the Marion Indians in the six–team league. The Belleville Stags became an affiliate of the New York Yankees and finished last in the league standings. The Stags finished with a record of 43–76, playing under managers Lee Mueller, Joseph Yurkovich, Addie Nesbit and Malcolm Mick. Belleville's Bunny Mick led the league in batting average, hitting .354. Belleville finished 22.0 games behind the first place Centralia Cubs. After drawing 13,500 for the 1949 season, Belleville permanently folded after the 1949 season and were replaced in the 1950 Mississippi–Ohio Valley League by the Vincennes Velvets.

The "Stags" had played as an independent local team before the minor league team, and they reformed to play as a local independent team into the 1950s after the demise of the professional franchise.

Today, the "Belleville Stags" moniker has been adopted by a local "vintage" baseball team, members of the Vintage Baseball Association.

Belleville, Illinois has not hosted another minor league team.

The ballpark
The Belleville Stags played home games at the Belleville Athletic Field. As the team was sponsored by Stag Beer, the ballpark was also referred to as "Stag Park." The ballpark was located at 901 South Illinois Street at Cleveland Avenue (Route 159 & IL 13), Belleville, Illinois. Today, the site houses an auto dealership.

Timeline

Year–by–year records

Notable alumni

Mike Blyzka (1948)
John Gabler (1949)
Frank Saucier (1948)
Bob Turley (1948) 3 x MLB All-Star; 1958 World Series MVP; 1958 Cy Young Award
Bud Thomas (1947)
Jack Urban (1949)

See also
Belleville Stags players

References

External links
Belleville - Baseball Reference

Defunct Midwest League teams
New York Yankees minor league affiliates
St. Louis Browns minor league affiliates
Belleville, Illinois
1947 establishments in Illinois
1949 disestablishments in Illinois
Illinois State League
Mississippi-Ohio Valley League
Defunct minor league baseball teams
Baseball teams established in 1947
Baseball teams disestablished in 1949
Professional baseball teams in Illinois
Defunct baseball teams in Illinois
Defunct sports teams in Illinois
Illinois State League teams